Blake House, also known as Newington, Royal Pines, and Joseph B. Pyatt House, is a historic home located at Arden, Buncombe County, North Carolina.  It was built about 1850, and is a two-story, double pile stone house in the Gothic Revival style. The main block is five bays wide and has a hipped roof. The center hall plan interior features Greek Revival-influenced interior finishes.  A rear ell was added in 1907.

It was listed on the National Register of Historic Places in 2010.

References

Houses on the National Register of Historic Places in North Carolina
Gothic Revival architecture in North Carolina
Greek Revival houses in North Carolina
Houses completed in 1850
Houses in Buncombe County, North Carolina
National Register of Historic Places in Buncombe County, North Carolina